Minimum-Maximum is a double DVD by German band Kraftwerk, consisting of live shows performed during their 2004 world tour. The set was released in Germany on 2 December 2005, in the UK on 5 December 2005 and 6 December 2005 in the US, Japan and Australia.

Track listing

Disc one
 "Meine Damen und Herren" – 0:35
 "The Man-Machine" – 7:54
 "Planet of Visions" – 4:46
 "Tour de France '03" – 10:40
 "Vitamin" – 6:42
 "Tour de France" – 6:18
 "Autobahn" – 8:52
 "The Model" – 3:42
 "Neonlights" – 5:52
 "Radioactivity" – 7:41
 "Trans Europe Express" – 9:38

Disc two
 "Numbers" – 4:33
 "Computer World" – 2:55
 "Home Computer" – 5:55
 "Pocket Calculator / Dentaku" – 6:14
 "The Robots" – 7:23
 "Elektrokardiogramm" – 4:42
 "Aéro Dynamik" – 7:13
 "Music Non Stop" – 9:49
 "Aerodynamik - MTV" – 3:48

Notebook
Notebook is the expanded version of the DVD. Initially released with PAL format DVDs in December 2005, the NTSC format version was delayed by a few weeks until early January 2006.

It contains the live concert DVD and audio CD albums, plus an 88-page commemorative hardback book of tour photographs. Like many other Kraftwerk products, it was released in both German and English language versions.

The photographs in the book are mostly images of Kraftwerk in performance during the 2004 world tour and follow the track sequence of that tour's live show.

The box packaging and contents were designed to mimic the appearance of the laptop computers Kraftwerk used during their performance.

Release details

Minimum-Maximum DVD

Minimum-Maximum Notebook

External links
 Release details of Minimum-Maximum
 Minimum-Maximum at Kraftwerk.com
 Notebook at Klingklang.com
 

Kraftwerk albums
2005 video albums
Live video albums
2005 live albums

ka:Minimum-Maximum#DVD